Downtown Heroes FC is an Indian professional football club based in Srinagar, Jammu and Kashmir. It competes in the JKFA Professional League, and was nominated for the I-League 2 qualifiers.

References 

Football clubs in Jammu and Kashmir
Sport in Srinagar
I-League 2nd Division clubs
Association football clubs established in 2020
2020 establishments in Jammu and Kashmir